Tucker McCann (born November 10, 1997) is an American football placekicker who is a free agent. He played college football at Missouri.

Early life and high school 
A native of O'Fallon, Illinois, McCann attended O'Fallon Township High School where he was the team's starting kicker from his sophomore to senior years. As a junior, he broke the Illinois state record for longest field goal at 60 yards. A consensus three star recruit, he received offers from Alabama, Florida State, and Missouri. He committed to Missouri on June 8, 2015.

College career 
McCann was the Tigers starting kicker all four years he attended Missouri. As a senior, he added punting duties in addition to his placekicking duties. McCann became the first person in the 21st century to have four punts of 50+ yards and make three field goals from 40+ yards in a 50–0 win over Southeast Missouri State.

Professional career 
After going undrafted in the 2020 NFL Draft, McCann signed with the Tennessee Titans as an undrafted free agent. He was waived on September 5, 2020, and signed to the practice squad the next day. He was placed on the practice squad/injured list by the team on November 7, 2020. He was signed to a futures contract by the Titans on January 11, 2021.  He was waived/injured on August 23, 2021, and placed on injured reserve. He was released on October 5.

References 

1997 births
Living people
American football placekickers
Missouri Tigers football players
People from St. Clair County, Illinois
Players of American football from Illinois
Sportspeople from Greater St. Louis
Tennessee Titans players